Garry A. Moore is a Democratic member of the South Dakota House of Representatives, representing the 18th district since 2006. He previously served from 1990 through 1998. He was a member of the South Dakota Senate from 1998 through 2006, serving as Minority Leader.

External links
South Dakota Legislature - Garry Moore official SD House website

Project Vote Smart - Representative Garry Allen Moore (SD) profile
Follow the Money - Garry A Moore
2008 2006 2004 2002 2000 campaign contributions

Democratic Party members of the South Dakota House of Representatives
Democratic Party South Dakota state senators
1949 births
Living people
People from Yankton, South Dakota